Chung-Ang Law School is one of the professional graduate schools of Chung-Ang University, located in Seoul, South Korea. Founded in 2009, it is one of the founding law schools in South Korea and is one of the smaller schools with each class in the three-year J.D. program having approximately 50 students.

History 
The law school traces its history to the major of law founded in May 1949 and later the college of law was founded on 1953 There are 5,166 graduates as of 2009 and 300 in practice of law.

Programs
 Chung-Ang Law specializes on the culture, media and entertainment law.
 The law school has a dual degree (JD/LLM) program with Indiana University Maurer School of Law-Bloomington.

JD Program

SJD Program 
The school offers SJD degrees on 14 special areas such as civil law, criminal law and international law etc.

Tuition
The tuition is around 18 million Korean Won per year and the school allocates 30% of the total tuition receipt to academic scholarship.

Faculty 
 Lee Sang-don Professor

Institute 
 Korean Broadcasting Law Institute
 Natural Resource Energy Law Institute
 Bio Energy Law Institute
 Culture, Media, Entertainment Law Institute

Publications 
 Chung-Ang Law Review

References

Website 
 Official Website
 Law Library

Law School
Law schools in South Korea
Educational institutions established in 2009
2009 establishments in South Korea
ko:중앙대학교 법학전문대학원